The enzyme 6-acetylglucose deacetylase (EC 3.1.1.33)  catalyzes the reaction

6-acetyl-D-glucose + H2O  D-glucose + acetate

This enzyme belongs to the family of hydrolases, specifically those acting on carboxylic ester bonds.  The systematic name of this enzyme class is 6-acetyl-D-glucose acetylhydrolase. This enzyme is also called 6-O-acetylglucose deacetylase.

References

 

EC 3.1.1
Enzymes of unknown structure